The eighth season of Nouvelle Star began on March 2 and finished on June 16. Virginie Guilhaume returned as the host for her sophomore season. André Manoukian remained as the only original jury member after eight years along Philippe Manœuvre and Lio. After one season Sinclair decided to leave and was replaced by former FFF-member Marco Prince because of, according to fellow judge Lio, personal dissatisfaction in the Nouvelle Star-experience for Sinclair.

Auditions were held in the following cities:
 Marseilles
 Toulouse
 Lyon
 Strasbourg
 Brussels
 Paris
After the auditions were over the top 124 were cut down in the Trianon Theater to 15 who eventually  competed in the first liveshow aiming to advance to the final group of ten.

Contestants
Top 10 Finalists

 Luce Brunet (20) - Winner
 François Raoult (25)  - Runner-up
 Ramón Mirabet (25)
 Lussi Lebrun (27)
 Benjamin Boehm (16)
 Dave Mgy (28)
 Annabelle (20)
 Stéphanie Vondenhoff (29)
 Sacha Page (19)
 Marine Maiwa (26)

Marine selected as the 10th finalist by the jury.

Semifinalists (Top 15)

 Ambre Dupont (23)
 Anna Torné (18)
 Lucia de Carvalho (29)
 Manon Trinquier (19)
 Siegfried Martin-Diaz (27)

Eliminations - Top 10

Elimination chart

References

External links 
 Official site

Season 08
2010 French television seasons